The Athlone Stadium is a stadium in Athlone on the Cape Flats in Cape Town, South Africa. It is used mostly for soccer matches and it is the home ground of Cape Town Spurs. The stadium holds 34,000 people and it was built in 1972.

The stadium was upgraded in the lead up to the 2010 FIFA World Cup with the intention of using it as a training venue.  The estimated cost of the upgrade was R297 million.

References

External links
Photos of Stadiums in South Africa at cafe.daum.net/stade
Stadium picture 

Soccer venues in South Africa
Sports venues in Cape Town
Santos F.C. (South Africa)
Sports venues completed in 1972
Athlone, Cape Town